This is a list of flag bearers who have represented Ethiopia at the Olympics.

Flag bearers carry the national flag of their country at the opening ceremony of the Olympic Games.

See also
Ethiopia at the Olympics

References

Ethiopia at the Olympics
Ethiopia
Olympic flagbearers